Burundi competed in the Olympic Games for the first time at the 1996 Summer Olympics in Atlanta, United States.  The nation won its first Olympic gold medal in this debut appearance at the Games.

Medalists

Results by event

Athletics

Men 

Track and road events

Women 

Track and road events

References
Official Olympic Reports
International Olympic Committee results database

Nations at the 1996 Summer Olympics
1996
Oly